Badminton has been part of the Pan American Games since the  1995 Games in Mar del Plata, Argentina. Canada has dominated the badminton events since its inception. At the most recent edition of the games in 2019, in Lima, five nations won medals, with Canada taking home four of the five titles.

Venues

The 1995 event was held in Buenos Aires, while 2015 was held in Markham.

Medal table

Medalists

Men
Singles

Doubles

Women
Singles

Doubles

Mixed
Doubles

Participating nations
The following nations have taken part in the badminton competition. The numbers in the table indicate the number of competitors sent to that year's Pan American Games. A total of 24 NOC's have entered badminton competitors into a Pan American Games competition.

Events

References

External links
Badminton Pan American Confederation
Sports123.com: Badminton at the Pan American Games 

 
Sports at the Pan American Games
Pan American Games
Badminton tournaments in North America
Badminton tournaments in South America